The 100th Regiment, Indiana Volunteer Infantry, was an infantry regiment that served in the Union Army during the American Civil War. It was one of three Union regiments referred to as the Persimmon regiment. Organized at Fort Wayne, Indiana, and mustered in September 10, 1862, the 100th participated in major campaigns and in 25 battles. The regiment was in the Grand Review of the Armies in Washington, D.C., on May 23–24, 1865, and mustered out on June 8, 1865. It lost during its service 58 officers and enlisted men killed in action or mortally wounded, and 176 by disease for a total of 234 fatalities.

Two officers of the 100th Indiana were awarded the Medal of Honor for extraordinary heroism at the Battle of Missionary Ridge, Tennessee, on November 25, 1863: Captain Charles W. Brouse of Company K, and Major Ruel M. Johnson, then in temporary command of the regiment.

Colonels
 Colonel Sanford J. Stoughton - resigned January 7, 1864.
 Lieutenant Colonel Albert Heath - discharged for disability May 10, 1865.
 Lieutenant Colonel Ruel M. Johnson - mustered out with regiment on June 8, 1865.

See also
 List of Indiana Civil War regiments

References

Bibliography 
 Transcription of letter showing Colonel Stoughton
 Another Transcription of letter showing Colonel Stoughton

Units and formations of the Union Army from Indiana
1862 establishments in Indiana
Military units and formations established in 1862
Military units and formations disestablished in 1865